Carlos Ruiz Zafón (25 September 1964 – 19 June 2020) was a Spanish novelist known for his 2001 novel La sombra del viento (The Shadow of the Wind).

Biography 
Ruiz Zafón was born in Barcelona. His grandparents had worked in a factory and his father sold insurance. Ruiz Zafón began his working life in advertising. In the 1990s he moved to Los Angeles where he worked briefly in screen writing. He was fluent in English.

Ruiz Zafón died of colorectal cancer in Los Angeles on 19 June 2020.

Literary career
Ruiz Zafón's first novel, El príncipe de la niebla 1993 (The Prince of Mist, published in English in 2010), earned the Edebé literary prize for young adult fiction. He was also the author of three additional young adult novels, El palacio de la medianoche (1994), Las luces de septiembre (1995) and Marina (1999).

In 2001 he published his first adult novel La sombra del viento (The Shadow of the Wind, Lucia Graves' English translation published in 2004), a Gothic mystery that involves Daniel Sempere's quest to track down the man responsible for destroying every book written by author Julian Carax. The novel has sold millions of copies worldwide, with more than a million copies sold in the UK. La sombra del viento garnered critical acclaim around the world.

Ruiz Zafón's next novel, El juego del ángel, was published in April 2008. The English edition, The Angel's Game, was also translated by Lucia Graves. It is a prequel to The Shadow of the Wind, also set in Barcelona, but during the 1920s and 1930s. It follows (and is narrated by) David Martín, a young writer who is approached by a mysterious figure to write a book. Ruiz Zafón intended it to be included in a four-book series along with The Shadow of the Wind.

The next book in the cycle, El prisionero del cielo, appeared in 2011. It returns to The Shadow of the Wind'''s Daniel Sempere and his travel back to the 1940s to resolve a buried secret. The novel was published in English in July 2012 as The Prisoner of Heaven.The Labyrinth of Spirits (original title: El laberinto de los espíritus) is the fourth and final book in the Cemetery of Forgotten Books series. The novel was initially released on 17 November 2016 in Spain and Latin America by Spanish publisher Planeta. HarperCollins published the English translation by Lucia Graves, which was released on 18 September 2018.

Ruiz Zafón's works have been published in 45 countries and have been translated into more than 40 languages. According to these figures, he is the most widely published contemporary Spanish writer, followed by Javier Sierra, whose works have been published in 42 countries, and Juan Gómez-Jurado, whose works have been published in 41 countries.

Influences
Influences on Ruiz Zafón's work have included 19th century classics, crime fiction, noir authors, and contemporary writers.

Apart from books, another large influence came in the form of films and screenwriting. He said in interviews that he found it easier to visualize scenes in his books in a cinematic way, which lends itself to the lush worlds and curious characters he created.

 Works 
 Young adult El príncipe de la niebla (1993), translated as The Prince of Mist (2010)El palacio de la medianoche (1994), translated as The Midnight Palace (2011)Las luces de septiembre (1995), translated as The Watcher in the Shadows (2013)Marina (1999), translated as Marina (2013)

 Novels El cementerio de los libros olvidados series (The Cemetery of Forgotten Books)La sombra del viento, 2001 (The Shadow of the Wind)El juego del ángel, 2008 (The Angel's Game)El prisionero del cielo, 2011 (The Prisoner of Heaven)
 Rosa de Fuego, 2012 (The Rose of Fire)El laberinto de los espíritus, 2016 (The Labyrinth of Spirits)La ciudad de vapor, 2021 (The City of Mist)

 Short stories 
"Rosa de fuego", 2012 ("The Rose of Fire")
"Two-Minute Apocalypse", (2015)

Awards and honors
 Edebé Award for Young Adult and Children's Literature 1993 for El príncipe de la niebla Finalist for the Fernando Lara Novel Award 2000, for The Shadow of the Wind Finalist for British Book Awards for author of the year, 2006
 Best Foreign Book Prize, France 2004
 Prix de Associations des Libraires du Québec 
 Casino da Póvoa Literary Prize, (Póvoa de Varzim), Portugal
 Bjornson Order of Literary Merit, Norway
 Barry Award for best novel, United States
 Original Voices Award, United States
 Selected as "a book to remember" by the New York Public Library, 2004
 José Manuel Lara Hernández Foundation Award, 2004 for the best selling book
 Booksense Prize, 2005, United States
 Euskadi de Plata 2008 for El juego del ángel Nielsen Award, United Kingdom
 Finalist for the Llibreter Award
 Ottakar's Award, United Kingdom
 José Manuel Lara Foundation Award for the best selling book
 Readers' Prize from La Vanguardia''
 Protagonistas Award, Spain

References

External links
 

 
 Biography 
Interview with Robert Ryan in The Times
Carlos Ruiz Zafón at Find a Grave

1964 births
2020 deaths
20th-century Spanish male writers
20th-century Spanish novelists
21st-century Spanish male writers
21st-century Spanish novelists
Barry Award winners
Burials at Hollywood Forever Cemetery
Writers from Catalonia
Deaths from cancer in California
Deaths from colorectal cancer
Spanish writers in the United States
Spanish male novelists
Writers from Barcelona
Spanish writers